Agustiar Batubara (born 20 August 1978 in Surabaya, East Java) is an Indonesian footballer. He played from 1999 to 2005 with Deltras Sidoarjo, from 2006 to 2008 with Pelita Jaya Purwakarta, and until 2008 with Persebaya Surabaya. Since 2011 he joined Barito Putra and captained the team. He has Batak descent from his parents, but he was born and grew up in Surabaya.

References

Indonesian footballers
Sportspeople from Surabaya
1978 births
Living people
Association football defenders
PS Barito Putera players